Bojan (Serbian Cyrillic and Macedonian: Бојан; Ukrainian,  Russian and Bulgarian Cyrillic: Боян, transcribed Boyan) is a Slavic given name, derived from the Slavic noun boj "battle." The ending -an is a suffix frequently found in anthroponyms of Slavic origin. The feminine variant is Bojana. The name is recorded in historical sources among Serbs, Bulgarians, Czechs, Poles, Croats, Slovenians, Macedonians, Ukrainians and Russians. In Slovenia, it is the 18th most popular name for males, as of 2010.

The name Bojan may refer to:

Bojan Bogdanović (born 1989), Croatian basketball player
Bojan Djordjic (born 1982), Swedish footballer of Serbian descent
Bojan Enravota, 9th century Bulgarian Christian martyr and saint
Bojan Jokić (born 1986), Slovenian football player
Bojan Jorgačević (born 1982), Serbian football player
Bojan Jovanovski (born 1986), Macedonian TV personality
Bojan Križaj (born 1957), Slovenian alpine skier
Bojan Krkić (born 1990), Spanish footballer
Bojan Marović (born 1984), Montenegrin singer
Bojan Neziri (born 1982), Serbian football player
Bojan Šarčević (born 1974), Bosnian-French visual artist
Bojan Stupica (1910–1970), Slovenian theatrical director
Bojan Zdešar (born 1984), Slovenian freestyle swimmer
Bojan Zulfikarpašić (born 1968), Serbian jazz pianist

See also
Boyan (given name)
Dagny Carlsson (1912–2022), Swedish blogger and supercentenarian who used the pen name "Bojan"

References

Slavic masculine given names
Serbian masculine given names
Croatian masculine given names
Bosnian masculine given names
Macedonian masculine given names
Slovene masculine given names
Montenegrin masculine given names